Indira Devi, born Effie Hippolet, was an actress of early silent Indian cinema.

Career
Indira Devi was born from Calcutta's Anglo-Indian community. She was a leading actress in early silent films for the Indian cinema. She paused her career in the early 1930s after her marriage. She played the lead role opposite Prithviraj Kapoor in Sher-e-Arab / Arabian Knights (1930). She returned to films in 1935.

Selected filmography
 Milaap (1937)
 Wamaq Azra/Sacchi Mohabbat (1935)
 Sher-e-Arab / Arabian Knights (1930)
 Vaman Avatar (1930)
 Ganesh Janam (1930)
 Rajsinha (1930) 
 Kapal Kundala (1929) 
 Jana (1927)
 Durgesh Nandini (1927)
 Punarjanma (1927)
 Jaydev (1926)

References

External links
 

Indian silent film actresses
Actresses in Hindi cinema
Actresses from Kolkata
20th-century Indian actresses
Anglo-Indian people
Actresses of European descent in Indian films
Date of birth missing
Date of death missing